Fleurs is the debut album from the experimental electronic group Former Ghosts, a collaborative effort between Jamie Stewart (Xiu Xiu), Freddy Ruppert ("This Song Is A Mess But So Am I") and Nika Roza (Zola Jesus).

Track listing
 "Us and Now" - 3:25
 "Hold On" - 4:28
 "Mother" - 4:04
 "Choices" - 4:21
 "In Earth's Palm" - 3:41
 "I Wave" - 3:51
 "Dreams" - 4:25
 "Unfolding" - 3:11
 "Flowers" - 3:26
 "The Bull and the Ram" - 5:35
 "Hello Again" - 3:31
 "This Is My Last Goodbye" - 3:22

References

2009 albums